Shanghai International Port (Group) Co., Ltd. (SIPG) is the exclusive operator of all the public terminals in the Port of Shanghai. It is a component of SSE 180 Index as well as CSI 300 Index and sub-index CSI 100 Index.

Overseas operations
In 2015, SIPG won the bid for the concession to operate the port of Haifa's new Bay Terminal in Israel for 25 years starting in 2021.

Football
The company owns and operates the professional football club Shanghai Port. In 2018, they became the Chinese national champions by winning the 2018 edition of the Chinese Super League.

Equity investments
Shanghai International Port is one of the major shareholders of the Bank of Shanghai.

SIPG is also a cornerstone investor of the Postal Savings Bank of China (PSBC) on the eve of PSBC's H share IPO. As of 31 December 2019, SIPG still owned PSBC's A and H ordinary shares directly or indirectly: 16.87% of all H ordinary shares of the bank, or equivalent to 3.89% of all classes of the ordinary shares, as well as 0.17% of A ordinary shares, or equivalent to 0.13% of all classes of the ordinary shares.

SIPG also partnered with COSCO Shipping to acquire the stake of OOIL, the parent company of OOCL.

References

External links

  

Port operating companies
Logistics companies of China
Companies based in Shanghai
Companies owned by the provincial government of China
Companies in the CSI 100 Index
Companies listed on the Shanghai Stock Exchange